Twice Removed from Yesterday is guitarist and songwriter Robin Trower's first solo album. It was released in March 1973.  Cover art is by "Funky" Paul Olsen. The album was re-released on CD in 1990 by Capitol.

Track listing
All songs written by James Dewar and Robin Trower, except where noted.

Side one
"I Can't Wait Much Longer" (Frankie Miller, Robin Trower) – 5:25
"Daydream" – 6:28
"Hannah" (James Dewar, Reg Isidore, Trower) – 5:30
"Man of the World" – 2:40

Side two
"I Can't Stand It" – 3:43
"Rock Me Baby" (B.B. King, Joe Josea) – 4:30
"Twice Removed from Yesterday" – 3:58
"Sinner's Song" – 5:25
"Ballerina" – 3:45

Personnel
 Robin Trower – guitar; additional vocals on "Twice Removed from Yesterday"
 James Dewar – bass, vocals
 Reg Isidore – drums
 Matthew Fisher – producer; organ on "Daydream"

References

External links 
 Robin Trower - Twice Removed from Yesterday (1973) album releases & credits at Discogs
 Robin Trower - Twice Removed from Yesterday (1973) album to be listened on Spotify
 Robin Trower - Twice Removed from Yesterday (1973) album to be listened on YouTube

1973 debut albums
Robin Trower albums
Albums produced by Matthew Fisher
Chrysalis Records albums